James McDonald (20 May 1856 – 15 August 1933) was an Australian politician.

He was born in Geelong to mason John McDonald and Catherine McIntyre. He was educated in Winchelsea and became a contractor and then a butcher at Inverleigh. He also ran orchards at Inverleigh and Colac. He served on Bannockburn Shire Council from 1888 to 1917, with four terms as president (1893–95, 1900–01, 1911–12, 1916–17). In 1917 he was elected to the Victorian Legislative Assembly for Polwarth, representing the Economy Party faction of the Nationalists. He was a minister without portfolio from 1924 to 1927. He held his seat until his death at Inverleigh in 1933. His nephew Allan McDonald succeeded him in the seat.

References

1856 births
1933 deaths
Nationalist Party of Australia members of the Parliament of Victoria
United Australia Party members of the Parliament of Victoria
Members of the Victorian Legislative Assembly
Politicians from Geelong